Mbembe, or more specifically Tigon Mbembe, is a Jukunoid language of Cameroon and Nigeria.

Writing system 
The alphabet is based on the General Alphabet of Cameroon Languages (GACL):

Tones are indicated by vowels with acutes, graves, circumflexes and carons.

References

Jukunoid languages
Languages of Nigeria
Languages of Cameroon